Additional time may refer to:
Stoppage time, added match time at the end of a match in association football, this added time is called "additional time" in FIFA documents.
Overtime (sports), additional period of play in sports